Sutherland River Provincial Park and Protected Area is a provincial park in British Columbia, Canada.

Sutherland River Park and Protected Area is located at the east end of Babine Lake.  It makes up a portion of the Sutherland River Drainage.  In 2000, Sutherland River Park was designated a class A Park following the recommendation of the Lakes Land and Resource Management Plan.  In 1999 it was designated a protected area by the Vanderhoof Land and Resource Management Plan.

The Sutherland River is a spawning site for sockeye and steelhead fish, as well as being a habitat for moose, grizzly bears, and wolves.

The park offers fishing, canoeing and kayaking, hiking, camping and hunting.

External links

Sutherland River Provincial Park and Protected Area from the British Columbia Ministry of Environment

Provincial parks of British Columbia
Regional District of Bulkley-Nechako
Protected areas established in 2001
2001 establishments in British Columbia